Vadtal is located in the Kheda district of Gujarat, India. It is the pilgrim centre of Swaminarayan Sampraday and the headquarter of Swaminarayan's temple. Gomati is a holy lake in Vadtal.

In 2011, ONGC announced that it would begin drilling operations in Vadtal in search of oil and gas. Its previous exploration in 2007 in Vadtal had found an oil field, which it is developing.

Transport 
Reaching Vadtal is very easy. Vadtal is connected via State Highway 5 km far. Vadtal is also connected with two Cities named as Nadiad and Anand. Vadtal is 15 km far from Both the cities. It takes 30min drives from both the places via pubilc or private transport. Reaching Vadtal from Anand is even better as frequency of city bus is available after every 30min.
Vadtal is also a railway terminus. A 14 mile long broad gauge line was opened in 1929 connecting it with Anand, benefitting pilgrims visiting the Swaminarayan Temple.

References

Villages in Kheda district
Swaminarayan Sampradaya